Luca Margaroli and Filip Polášek were the defending champions but chose not to defend their title.

Artem Sitak and Igor Zelenay won the title after defeating Karol Drzewiecki and Szymon Walków 7–5, 6–4 in the final.

Seeds

Draw

References

External links
 Main draw

Prosperita Open - Doubles
2020 Doubles